Stephane Lecours (born 1971 or 1972) is a Canadian retired Paralympic swimmer. He competed at the 1988 Paralympics and won five gold medals. He is from Hearst, Ontario.

References

Living people
1970s births
Paralympic swimmers of Canada
Medalists at the 1988 Summer Paralympics
Paralympic gold medalists for Canada
Paralympic medalists in swimming
Swimmers at the 1988 Summer Paralympics
Canadian male freestyle swimmers
Canadian male backstroke swimmers
Canadian male breaststroke swimmers
Canadian male butterfly swimmers
Canadian male medley swimmers